Rafael Ajlec (Mokronog, 29 August 1915 – 11 December 1977, Ljubljana) was a Slovenian musicologist, journalist, and critic. He was born in Mokronog, Carniola. He taught music history at the University of Ljubljana's School of Education. He studied the works of Slovenian composers and the life of Jacobus Gallus. He died in Ljubljana.

References 
 Slovenski veliki leksikon, Mladinska knjiga (2003)

1915 births
1977 deaths
Slovenian musicologists
Slovenian music critics
Slovenian journalists
Academic staff of the University of Ljubljana
People from the Municipality of Mokronog-Trebelno
20th-century musicologists
20th-century journalists
Yugoslav musicologists